Diachasma is a genus of the Opiinae subfamily of insects and is characterized by the lack of a carapace-like metasoma and clypeal structures that other opiines share.

Species
Species include:
Diachasma alloeum
Diachasma caffer
Diachasma ferrugineum
Diachasma muliebre

References

Braconidae
Ichneumonoidea genera
Taxa named by Arnold Förster